Swap Shop may refer to:

A Give-Away Shop
The Fort Lauderdale Swap Shop, Florida, a 14-screen drive-in theater complex and flea market

Entertainment
Swap Shop, a 1988 Australian Broadcasting Corporation children's television program
Multi-Coloured Swap Shop (1976–1982), a BBC One Saturday morning television programme
Basil's Swap Shop, a 2008 relaunch of the BBC show, starring puppet character Basil Brush
Williams Street Swap Shop, live-streaming show produced by Williams Street
Tradio, a radio program where listeners can call in to buy and sell items